St. Stephens African Methodist Episcopal Church, is a historic African American church located at 7741 Mayfield Ave, Elkridge, Maryland.

The building was constructed in 1874.

See also
Mount Zion United Methodist Church (Ellicott City, Maryland)
Asbury Methodist Episcopal Church (Annapolis Junction, Maryland)
Mt. Moriah Lodge No. 7

References

External links
St. Stephens

African-American history of Howard County, Maryland
African Methodist Episcopal churches in Maryland
Elkridge, Maryland